This is the discography of German Eurodisco trio Arabesque. Included is the discography of Rouge, the duo formed by Michaela Rose and Jasmin Vetter after the departure of Sandra.

Albums

Studio albums

Live albums

Compilation albums

Box sets

Video albums

Singles

Rouge discography

Albums

Singles

Notes

References 

Discographies of German artists